The 2015 Hardee's Pro Classic is a professional tennis tournament played on outdoor clay courts. It is the fifteenth edition of the tournament and part of the 2015 ITF Women's Circuit, offering a total of $50,000 in prize money. It takes place in Dothan, Alabama, United States, on 20–26 April 2015.

Singles main draw entrants

Seeds 

 1 Rankings as of 13 April 2015

Other entrants 
The following players received wildcards into the singles main draw:
  Tornado Alicia Black
  Maureen Drake
  Alexandra Stevenson
  Katerina Stewart

The following players received entry from the qualifying draw:
  Jacqueline Cako
  Elizaveta Ianchuk
  Jessica Moore
  Petra Rampre

The following player received entry by a lucky loser spot:
  Kateřina Kramperová

The following player received entry by a protected ranking:
  Jessica Pegula

Champions

Singles

 Louisa Chirico def.  Katerina Stewart, 7–6(7–1), 3–6, 7–6(7–1)

Doubles

 Johanna Konta  /  Maria Sanchez def.  Paula Cristina Gonçalves /  Petra Krejsová, 6–3, 6–4

External links 
 2015 Hardee's Pro Classic at ITFtennis.com
 Official website

2015 ITF Women's Circuit
2015
2015 in American tennis